Martin Wallace is an English board game designer from Manchester.

Early life and education
Martin Wallace was born and raised in the U.K., and has been resident in Manchester for most of those years. He began gaming in his teens, starting with titles from SPI and Avalon Hill, and as a student he got into Dungeons & Dragons.

Career
Wallace worked for a while at Games Workshop, then started designing games in earnest in the early 1990s, his first DTP game being Lords of Creation. Eventually German companies picked up a few of his games, such as Und Tschüss, Volldampf, and Tempus. He has also published a number of games through his own company, Warfrog. These include such titles as Struggle of Empires and Princes of the Renaissance.

Wallace is the founder and chief designer of Treefrog (former Warfrog) Games. Wallace is known for designing complex strategy games that depict a variety of historical settings. Two themes he has frequently used are the construction and operation of railroads, and the rise and fall of ancient civilizations. He has developed a reputation for blending elegant European style game mechanics with the strong themes that are more typical of American style games. Many of his games feature economic systems, incorporating rules for income, taxation, and debt. In 2016, Wallace announced the closure of Treefrog Games and focussing on being a full-time game designer.

Notable games
Empires of the Ancient World (2000)
Liberté (2001)
Volldampf (2001)
Tyros (2002)
Princes of the Renaissance (2003)
Secrets of the Tombs (2003)
Runebound (2004)
Struggle of Empires (2004)
Byzantium (2005)
Railroad Tycoon (2005)
Tempus (2006)
Perikles (2006)
Brass (2007)
Tinners' Trail (2008)
After The Flood (2008)
Steel Driver (2008)
Steam: Rails to Riches (2009)
Waterloo (2009)
Automobile (2009)
Rise of Empires (2009)
Last Train to Wensleydale (2009)
God's Playground (2009)
Moongha Invaders (2010)
Age of Industry (2010)
London (2010)
First Train to Nuremberg (2010)
Gettysburg (2010)
A Few Acres of Snow (2011)
Discworld: Ankh-Morpork (2011)
Aeroplanes: Aviation Ascendant (2012)Doctor Who: The Card Game (2012)Discworld: The Witches (2013)A Study in Emerald (2013) based on Neil Gaiman’s short story A Study in EmeraldOnwards to Venus (2014) based on Greg Broadmore’s Dr GrordbortMythotopia (2014)Ships (2015)A Study in Emerald Second Edition (2015)Via Nebula (2016)Hit Z Road (2016)A Handful of Stars (2017)AuZtralia (2018)Judge Dredd Helter Skelter (2019)Milito (2019)Nanty Narking (2019)Anno 1800 (2020)Tinners' Trail (2021) (new, reworked edition)Rocketmen'' (2021)

References

External links
 Treefrog Games website domain has been bought by another company. Link directs to Wayback Machine archive.
 Martin Wallace article in The Games Journal
 
 Rank-ordered list of Martin Wallace's games

Living people
Year of birth missing (living people)
Board game designers
Mass media people from Manchester